Hipple is an American surname originating from the German and Dutch surname Hippel. It may refer to the following notable people:
Eric Hipple (born 1957), American football player and public speaker 
Hugh Marlowe (Hugh Herbert Hipple, 1911–1982), American film, television, stage and radio actor
Ruth B. Hipple (1873–1962), American suffragist
John E. and Ruth Hipple House in Pierre, South Dakota, U.S.

References